The Jonava Bridge is a bridge in Jonava, Lithuania. It crosses the river Neris. Big trucks are not allowed to cross the bridge, they need to cross over Taurosta Bridge. Bridge has 1 way lanes going each way.

References 

Bridges in Jonava